The GAZ-67 and the GAZ-67B (from January 1944) were general-purpose four-wheel drive Soviet military vehicles built by GAZ starting in 1943. By the end of the war, it was the Soviet equivalent of the World War II jeep.

The GAZ-67 was a further development of the earlier GAZ-64. A main improvement was a wider track of 1446 mm. It also had a strengthened chassis frame, enlarged fuel tank and other improvements. Production started on 23 September 1943 (the first serial vehicle produced). From January 1944 it was replaced by the GAZ-67B, which had further mechanical improvements.

Sources
 Evgeniy Prochko, Vezdekhody RKKA, 1998, Armada series,

External links

 Images of the GAZ-67

GAZ Group vehicles
World War II vehicles of the Soviet Union
Military light utility vehicles
Military vehicles introduced from 1940 to 1944